Habuba Kabira (also Hubaba Kabire) at Tell Qanas is the site of an Uruk settlement along the Euphrates in Syria, founded during the later part of the Uruk period. It was about 800 mi (1,300 km) from the city of Uruk. The site is now mostly underwater due to the Tabqa Dam project. It consists of Habuba Kabira South, which is protoliterate, and Habuba Kabira North, which is protoliterate, Middle Bronze Age, Late Bronze Age, and Roman.

History
Habuba Kabira was built around 3500 BCE on a regular plain with strong defensive walls, but was abandoned after a few generations and never inhabited again. The site is around 18 hectares in area, with the walled area encompassing 10 hectares.

Lisa Cooper cites evidence from Heinrich, et al. 1969 as well as Heusch, 1980 indicating that the site was reinhabited from late Early Bronze Age to Middle Bronze Age with reuse of building walls and the defensive walls.

There were also several other late Uruk enclaves and outposts in this general area. They include Arslantepe (attested at level VIA), Hassek Höyük (attested at level 5), Jebel/Djebel Aruda (8 kilometers north near Tell es-Sweyhat), and Tepecik (Elazığ Province, attested at level 3). Godin Tepe is a similar site in Iran.

Archaeology
The site was excavated for 9 seasons from 1969 to 1975 by a Deutsche Orient-Gesellschaft team led by Ernst Heinrich and Eva Strommenger.  It was part of the Tabqa Dam rescue excavation effort. Small finds included 4 clay tokens.

Notes

References
Dietrich Surenhagen, Keramikproduktion in Habuba Kabira-Sud: Unters. zur Keramikproduktion innerhalb d. spat-urukzeitl. Siedlung Habuba Kabira-Sud in Nordsyrien, Hessling, 1978,

See also
Cities of the ancient Near East
History of Mesopotamia
Jawa

External links

DOG site for German dig

Populated places established in the 4th millennium BC
1969 archaeological discoveries
Archaeological sites in Aleppo Governorate
Former populated places in Syria
Uruk period